Oleksandr Kosevych (born 4 September 1965) is a former Ukrainian footballer and football coach.

References

External links
 
 

1965 births
Living people
Ukrainian footballers
Ukrainian football managers
FC Kryvbas Kryvyi Rih managers
FC Zorya Luhansk managers
FC Kramatorsk managers
FC Shakhtar Donetsk non-playing staff
FC Metalurh Donetsk
Association footballers not categorized by position
Footballers from Donetsk